The following is a list of Irish artists nominated for MTV Europe Music Awards. List does not include MTV Europe Music Award for Best UK & Ireland Act, New Sounds of Europe or MTV Europe Music Award for Best European Act. Winners are in bold text.

MTV Europe Music Awards